North Shore is a census-designated place in southeastern Riverside County, so named because of its location along the northeast shore of the Salton Sea. It was once a popular vacation destination spot before ever-increasing salinity and pollution of the Salton Sea shut the tourist trade down. The population was 3,585 at the 2020 census, up from 3,477 at the 2010 census.

The town traces its beginnings to 1958 when developers Ray Ryan and Trav Rogers purchased the land on which the town would sit and began to sell individual parcels in 1960.

North Shore is notable as the home of the Sonny Bono Salton Sea National Wildlife Refuge. A proposed system of dikes that will help control the increasing salinity of the Salton Sea will also serve to stop further encroachment on the refuge.

One building is particularly noteworthy.  The North Shore Beach and Yacht Club, an Albert Frey design, opened in 1962 and was in active use until 1984; rising water levels destroyed the jetty in 1981, thereby making it impossible for boats to dock there.  As recently as the early 2000s, it was possible to enter the lobby prior to its being boarded up, although stairs leading to the second floor had been removed prior to its abandonment.  The lobby was once littered with hotel receipts from the neighboring North Shore Motel (razed in 2008) dating back to the club's last days. The yacht club has been restored under a $3.35 million grant and since 2011 is open to the public as a Community Center and historical landmark.  The Salton Sea History Museum was relocated to Mecca, California in February 2012.

North Shore is accessible via State Route 111 at the Imperial County line.  The wildlife refuge and campground is a short distance south of the town.

The ZIP Code is 92254, and the community is inside area codes 442 and 760.

Geography
According to the United States Census Bureau, the CDP covers an area of 11.2 square miles (28.9 km), all of it land.

Demographics
The 2010 United States Census reported that North Shore had a population of 3,477. The racial makeup of North Shore was 1,394 (40.1%) White, 33 (0.9%) African American, 26 (0.7%) Native American, 18 (0.5%) Asian, 5 (0.1%) Pacific Islander, 1,884 (54.2%) from other races, and 117 (3.4%) from two or more races. Hispanic or Latino of any race were 3,313 persons (95.3%).

The Census reported that 3,477 people (100% of the population) lived in households, 0 (0%) lived in non-institutionalized group quarters, and 0 (0%) were institutionalized.

There were 750 households, out of which 542 (72.3%) had children under the age of 18 living in them, 550 (73.3%) were opposite-sex married couples living together, 83 (11.1%) had a female householder with no husband present, 52 (6.9%) had a male householder with no wife present.  There were 47 (6.3%) unmarried opposite-sex partnerships, and 10 (1.3%) same-sex married couples or partnerships. 47 households (6.3%) were made up of individuals, and 13 (1.7%) had someone living alone who was 65 years of age or older. The average household size was 4.64.  There were 685 families (91.3% of all households); the average family size was 4.83.

The population was spread out, with 1,388 people (39.9%) under the age of 18, 418 people (12.0%) aged 18 to 24, 918 people (26.4%) aged 25 to 44, 621 people (17.9%) aged 45 to 64, and 132 people (3.8%) who were 65 years of age or older.  The median age was 23.6 years. For every 100 females, there were 110.6 males.  For every 100 females age 18 and over, there were 109.9 males.

The homeowner vacancy rate was 3.0%; the rental vacancy rate was 12.5%.  2,826 people (81.3% of the population) lived in owner-occupied housing units and 651 people (18.7%) lived in rental housing units.

See also
 Salton Sea State Recreation Area

References

Further reading

External links
 North Shore at Google Maps
 North Shore Epodunk.com profile
 Where the Ghost Bird Sings by the Poison Springs Outside article
 History of the town and yacht club at sci.sdsu.edu

Census-designated places in Riverside County, California
Populated places in the Colorado Desert
Coachella Valley
1958 establishments in California
Populated places established in 1958
Census-designated places in California